Subbayya Gari Hotel (also known as Kakinada Vaari Subbayya Gari Hotel) is an Indian chain of vegetarian restaurants headquartered in Kakinada, Andhra Pradesh. It was founded in 1950 by Subbayya and currently has branches in various Indian cities.

History 
In 1950, Subbayya started a hotel mess with ten employees. Then in 1955, he started a hotel originally known as Sri Krishna Villas at present-day Subbayya Gari Junction in Kakinada, serving Andhra bhojanam called as "Butta Bhojanam". It soon became a famous restaurant in the Telugu states.

In 2018, the chain opened its first restaurant in Hyderabad and later spread throughout other Indian cities.

Products 

 Butta Bhojanam

Butta Bhojanam in Telugu means Basket Bhojanam. The entire Andhra bhojanam is served in a Basket made with leaves. It consists of Plain rice, Pappu, Sambar, Vegetable fry, Majjiga pulusu, Pickles, Sweet, Podi (Powders), Pulihora, Veg curries, Curd, Appadams. This product is the main reason behind the success of the hotel.

 Vadiyalu
 Single meals
 Panasakaya Biryani
 Dry Podis (Dry Powders)
 Andhra sweets
 Veg curries
 Andhra pickles

References

1950 establishments in India
Restaurants established in 1950
Restaurants in Kakinada
Restaurants in Bangalore
Restaurants in Hyderabad, India
Restaurants in Visakhapatnam
Vegetarian restaurants in India
Catering and food service companies of India
Restaurant chains in India
Companies based in Andhra Pradesh
Andhra cuisine
Restaurants in Chennai